The Platinum Jubilee High School (PJHS) is an English medium school in Warangal, Telangana, India. It is recognized by the Telangana State Education Department, and follows the State Education Board curriculum. The school has 1,500 students from pre-primary through Grade 10.

History 
Platinum Jubilee High School was established in 1953 by the Aga Khan Social Welfare Society. It was integrated into the Aga Khan Education Services (AKES) in 1998.

Facilities

Pre-primary students
 Joy library
 Learning areas
 Sand pit
 Water play
 Play equipment
 Puppet theatre

Primary students
 Junior library
 Junior Science library
 Junior Computer laboratory
 Math laboratory
 Audio-visual Centre
 Play park

Secondary students
 Library with Open Access system
 Computer laboratory
 Internet connection to all PCs in the Computer Lab and elsewhere
 Teacher Resource Centre
 Physical Science laboratory
 Biology laboratory
 Play ground
 Multipurpose hall
 Aakash live coaching classes
 Comfortable furniture
 Playing area
 D.F.C.
 Computer lab

Teachers Resource Centre
The Teachers Resource Centre (TRC) supports and facilitates in-service professional development of the faculty. Apart from the educational reference material available in the TRC, it serves as a platform for teachers to interact. The TRC has four computers with broadband internet access.

Parent-Teacher Association
The school seeks parental co-operation and assistance through the Parent-Teacher Association (PTA), which promotes a closer relationship between home and school. There are separate associations for the pre-primary, primary and secondary sections, which are elected annually.

PTA members assist the school in:
Reviewing the school's progress through Parent Development Meetings
Communicating between the school and parents
Supporting the school's activities and initiatives, e.g., organizing social events for students

Aga Khan Education Services 
The school is part of the Aga Khan Education Services (AKES). The foundations of the present system were laid by Sir Sultan Mohamed Shah, Aga Khan III, under whose guidance over 200 schools were established during the first half of the 20th century, the first of them in 1905 in Zanzibar, Gwadur in Pakistan and Mundra in India. Since the creation of Aga Khan Education Services companies in the 1970s, the schools have been centrally administered and managed.

See also
Education in India
List of schools in India

References
 Aga Khan Schools in India
 Platinum Jubilee High School

External links 

High schools and secondary schools in Telangana
Educational institutions established in 1953
Education in Warangal
1953 establishments in India